Hercules (Greek: Ηρακλής) was a Greek manufacturer of agricultural machinery based in Kerkyra (Corfu). It also produced light vehicles categorized as "farm equipment" according to Greek law, including light all-terrain vehicles. The latter used Namco parts and Mitsubishi, Kubota and Ruggerini engines. Small numbers of the particular type were produced between 1980 and 1983.

References 
 L.S. Skartsis and G.A. Avramidis, "Made in Greece", Typorama, Patras, Greece (2003)  (republished by the University of Patras Science Park, 2007).
L.S. Skartsis, "Greek Vehicle & Machine Manufacturers 1800 to present: A Pictorial History", Marathon (2012)  (eBook)

External links 

 World vehicle manufacturers

Defunct motor vehicle manufacturers of Greece
Cars of Greece
Companies based in Corfu
1983 disestablishments in Greece